The American Music Award for Favorite Song – Rap/Hip Hop has been awarded since 2016. Three songs are nominated per year. Cardi B became the first artist to win the award twice. She has won three times.

Winners and nominees

2010s

2020s

Category facts

Multiple wins
3 wins
 Cardi B

Multiple nominations
 3 nominations
 Cardi B
 Drake

 2 nominations
 Jack Harlow
 Lil Nas X
 Post Malone
 Roddy Ricch

References

American Music Awards
Hip hop awards
Song awards
Awards established in 2016